Peter Richard Hayes (born 11 April 1963) is a British diplomat. He was formerly the Commissioner of the British Indian Ocean Territory and the British Antarctic Territory.

Early life
He was educated at the University of Surrey (BSc, Physics) and King's College London (PhD, 1989).

Career
Originally trained as a physicist, in 1990 Hayes joined the Civil Service in the National Physical Laboratory, later working in the Department of Trade and Industry, the Cabinet Office, the Office of Science and Technology, and the Foreign and Commonwealth Office. He worked for the British Embassy to the United States as a Counsellor for 2001–2005.

In 2005 Hayes was appointed Principal Private Secretary to the Foreign Secretary, serving under Jack Straw, Margaret Beckett and David Miliband until 2007. From 2008 to 2010 Hayes was the British High Commissioner to Sri Lanka, and concurrently the non-resident High Commissioner to the Maldives. He then went on secondment to the London Stock Exchange as their Head of Public Affairs.

From 2012 to 2016, he was Commissioner of the British Indian Ocean Territory and the British Antarctic Territory.

Personal life
In 2002, Hayes married Kirsty Hayes, a fellow diplomat. They have two children.

References

Offices held

1963 births
Living people
Alumni of the University of Surrey
Alumni of King's College London
Principal Private Secretaries to the Secretary of State for Foreign and Commonwealth Affairs
High Commissioners of the United Kingdom to Sri Lanka
Members of HM Diplomatic Service
Commissioners of the British Indian Ocean Territory
Commissioners of the British Antarctic Territory
21st-century British diplomats